Central Railroad Company of Indiana  is a Class III short-line railroad that operates  of track in Southeastern Indiana and Southwestern Ohio.

Beginning in Shelby County, Indiana, the line runs generally southeast from Shelbyville through the towns of Prescott, Waldron and Saint Paul, then the Decatur County towns of Adams, Greensburg and New Point.  At this point a short stretch of the line passes east through the extreme southwestern corner of Franklin County, then heads southeast through the Ripley County communities of Batesville, Morris, Spades and Sunman, and the Dearborn County towns of Weisburg, Kennedy, Guilford and Greendale.  

The line runs adjacent to CSX Transportation's former Baltimore & Ohio Railroad Cincinnati to St. Louis main line from CIND MP 2.5 (Storrs) to MP 17.7 (Valley Jct.).

The trackage has been part of the CCC&St.L (Big Four Railroad), part of what was the New York Central Railroad, later Penn Central Corporation and most recently Conrail.

Central Railroad of Indiana is a subsidiary of Genesee & Wyoming.  G&W bought RailAmerica in 2012, which acquired CIND in 2000.

The majority of the railroad's traffic comes from grain, chemical products, steel, and completed automobiles.  The CIND hauled around 8,500 carloads in 2008.

Mileposts and control points

References

External links

Central Railroad of Indiana official webpage - Genesee & Wyoming website

Ohio railroads
Indiana railroads
Transportation in Dearborn County, Indiana
Transportation in Decatur County, Indiana
Transportation in Franklin County, Indiana
Transportation in Ripley County, Indiana
Transportation in Shelby County, Indiana
RailAmerica
Spin-offs of Conrail